Honky Tonk Angels is a collaborative studio album by Dolly Parton, Loretta Lynn and Tammy Wynette. It was released on November 2, 1993, by Columbia Records. The album was certified Gold by the RIAA on January 5, 1994, for sales of 500,000 copies.

Background
The album had been a long-rumored project between the country singers for over a decade. It was mostly Parton's idea to bring together the women who made their musical breakthroughs in the '60s. These were also the women who changed the texture of
the music by weaving strands of modern life into the traditional country patterns they grew up with and helped enlarge the audience for country music. Once Parton talked the others into doing the project–an easy argument, by all accounts–she asked Buckingham to co-produce with her.

Content
The album features many country standards, including "It Wasn't God Who Made Honky Tonk Angels" (which features a guest vocal appearance by the song's originator and the original country queen, Kitty Wells), "Wings of a Dove" (a 1960 hit for Ferlin Husky), "I Forgot More Than You'll Ever Know" (a 1953 hit for the Davis Sisters), "Put It Off Until Tomorrow" (a 1966 Bill Phillips hit that was Parton's first success as a songwriter), "Lovesick Blues" (a pop standard known for Hank Williams' 1949 rendition; here the trio sings along with a vintage recording of the song by Patsy Cline), and "I Dreamed of a Hillbilly Heaven", Tex Ritter's 1962 classic that features new spoken dialogue written by Parton.

The original songs by Loretta Lynn and Tammy Wynette are solo performances by each of them with harmony vocals by Parton and "Sittin' on the Front Porch Swing" is a Parton solo. The album features liner notes written by Ralph Emery.

Critical reception

The review published in the November 27, 1993, issue of Billboard said that the album is "a spirited collaboration that brings together three country music cornerstones and throws in a pinch of Patsy Cline and Kitty Wells for good measure." The review went on to say, "There are a few musically inspired moments here, notably Parton's "Sittin' on the Front Porch Swing" and Wynette's "That's the Way It Could Have Been". But, for the most part, this is more of a nostalgic look back than a celebration of present–day glories."

Kelly McCartney of AllMusic wrote that "for fans of traditional country or great singers, this is a fun listen because it nicely captures three of the best voices around."

Commercial performance
The album peaked at No. 6 on the US Billboard Top Country Albums chart and No. 42 on the US Billboard 200 chart. In Canada, the album peaked at No. 6 on the RPM Country Albums chart and No. 44 on the RPM Albums chart.

The only single, "Silver Threads and Golden Needles", was released in November 1993 and peaked at No. 68 on the US Billboard Hot Country Singles & Tracks chart.

Accolades
The album and its single were nominated for several awards. The album was nominated for Album of the Year at the 1994 TNN Music City News Country Awards and "Silver Threads and Golden Needles" was nominated for Vocal Collaboration of the Year. "Silver Threads and Golden Needles" also received a nomination at the 37th Annual Grammy Awards for Best Country Collaboration with Vocals and Vocal Event of the Year at the 28th Annual Country Music Association Awards.

37th Annual Grammy Awards

|-
| style="text-align:center;"|1995
| style="text-align:center;"| "Silver Threads and Golden Needles"
| Best Country Collaboration with Vocals
|
|-
|}

28th Annual Country Music Association Awards

|-
| style="text-align:center;"|1994
| style="text-align:center;"| "Silver Threads and Golden Needles"
| Vocal Event of the Year
|
|-
|}

1994 TNN Music City News Country Awards

|-
| rowspan="2" style="text-align:center;"|1994
| style="text-align:center;"| Honky Tonk Angels
| Album of the Year
|
|-
| style="text-align:center;"|"Silver Threads and Golden Needles"
| Vocal Collaboration of the Year
|
|-
|}

Track listing

Personnel 
Adapted from the album liner notes.

Eddie Bayers – drums
Harold Bradley – tic-tac ("Lovesick Blues")
Owen Bradley – producer ("Lovesick Blues")
Steve Buckingham – producer
Patsy Cline – guest vocals ("Lovesick Blues")
Don Cobb – editing
Floyd Cramer – piano ("Lovesick Blues")
Jimmy Day – steel ("Lovesick Blues")
Richard Dennison – backing vocals
Hank Garland – electric guitar ("Lovesick Blues")
Steve Gibson – guitar, tic-tac
Rob Hajacos – fiddle
Vicki Hampton – background vocals
Buddy Harman – drums ("Lovesick Blues")
Roy Huskey Jr. – upright bass
Bill Johnson – art direction, design
Beth Kindig – art assistance
Cari Landers – production assistant
Jason Lehning – assistant engineer
Loretta Lynn – lead vocals, harmony vocals
Grady Martin – electric guitar ("Lovesick Blues")
Bob Moore – upright bass ("Lovesick Blues")
Marshall Morgan – engineer
Farrell Morris – vibes
Weldon Myrick – steel
Louis Nunley – backing vocals
Jennifer O'Brien-Enoch – backing vocals, vocal coordinator
Gary Paczosa – engineer
Dolly Parton – lead vocals, harmony vocals, producer
Denny Purcell – mastering
Tom Robb – bass
Hargus "Pig" Robbins – piano
Billy Sanford – guitar
Alan Schulman – additional engineering
Toby Seay – additional engineering
Ed Simonton – assistant engineer
Adam Steffy – mandolin
Bruce Watkins – acoustic guitar
Cindy Reynolds Watt – harp
Rollow Welch – art direction, design
Kitty Wells – guest vocals ("It Wasn't God Who Made Honky Tonk Angels")
Bruce Wolfe – cover painting
Tammy Wynette – lead vocals, harmony vocals

Note: "Lovesick Blues" was recorded by Patsy Cline on January 27, 1960, and produced by Owen Bradley. The musicians for this session are noted above.

Charts
Album

Singles

Certifications

References 

1993 albums
Loretta Lynn albums
Dolly Parton albums
Tammy Wynette albums
Albums produced by Steve Buckingham (record producer)
Albums produced by Owen Bradley
Columbia Records albums
Collaborative albums